Epitrichosma anisocausta is a species of moth of the family Tortricidae. It is found in Australia, where it has been recorded from the Northern Territory.

The wingspan is about 12 mm. The forewings are grey whitish, with a large fuscous basal patch. The hindwings are grey whitish.

References

Moths described in 1916
Schoenotenini